Oulema is a genus of leaf beetles in the family Chrysomelidae.

Species
These 30 species belong to the genus Oulema:

Oulema arizonae (Schaeffer, 1919) i c g b
Oulema atrosuturalis (Pic, 1923) g
Oulema brunnicollis (Lacordaire, 1845) i c g
Oulema collaris (Say, 1824) i c g b
Oulema concolor (Le Conte, 1884) i c g b
Oulema cornuta (Fabricius, 1801) i c g b
Oulema dilutipes (Fairmaire, 1885) g
Oulema duftschmidi (Redtenbacher, 1874) g
Oulema elongata R. White, 1993 i c g
Oulema erichsonii (Suffrian, 1841) g
Oulema gallaeciana (Heyden, 1870) g
Oulema hoffmannseggii (Lacordaire, 1845) g
Oulema laticollis R. White, 1993 i c g
Oulema longipennis (Linell, 1897) i c g b
Oulema maculicollis (Lacordaire, 1845) i c g b
Oulema magistrettiorum (Ruffo, 1964) g
Oulema margineimpressa (Schaeffer, 1933) i c g b
Oulema melanopus (Linnaeus, 1758) i c g b (cereal leaf beetle)
Oulema minuta R. White, 1993 i c g
Oulema obscura (Stephens, 1831) g
Oulema oryzae (Kuwayama, 1931) g
Oulema palustris (Blatchley, 1913) i c g b
Oulema rufocyanea (Suffrian, 1847) g
Oulema sayi (Crotch, 1873) i c g b
Oulema septentrionis (Weise, 1880) g
Oulema simulans (Schaeffer, 1933) i c g b
Oulema taophiloides Gómez-Zurita, 2011 g
Oulema texana (Crotch, 1873) i c g b
Oulema tristis (Herbst, 1786) g
Oulema variabilis R. White, 1993 i c g b

Data sources: i = ITIS, c = Catalogue of Life, g = GBIF, b = Bugguide.net

References

Criocerinae
Chrysomelidae genera